Manvila (Monvila) is a place in Trivandrum, the capital city of Kerala. It is located between Sreekaryam and Kulathoor. It is located near the National Highway 66. Trivandrum Technopark and College Of Engineering Trivandrum (CET) are located near Manvila. Manvila Industrial Estate is one of the major industrial areas in Kerala. It houses various industrial firms like Keltron, Family Plastics, Coconics Laptops, Printing Press etc. Roads from Aakkulam, Pangappara, Kazhakoottam and Sreekaryam meet at Manvila. Manvila has seen a growth in the recent years due to the proximity of Technopark and Technovalley, the IT corridor of Kerala. A transmitting station of All India Radio is also present in Manvila.

Institutions and Offices 

 Keltron Communication Complex
 All India Radio
 Attipra Village Office
 Coconics Ltd
 Family Plastics and Thermoware Pvt Ltd

Academic Institutions 

 Bharatiya Vidya Bhavan
 Agricultural Co-operative Staff Training Institute (ACSTI)
Manvila Government Lower Primary School
 Pallottigiri Seminary

Places of Worship 

 Major Sree Bala Subrahmanya Swami Temple
 Little Flower, Saint Therese of Lisieux Roman Catholic Latin Church
 Swayamprakasha Asramam
 ST.Mary's M.S.C Church Manvila
 Juma Masjid
 Iskcon namahatta, Hare Krishna
 Thampuran Kavu Temple

Recently 

Manvila gained attention in October, 2018 due to a massive fire explosion caused in the Family Plastics Factory.

References

Suburbs of Thiruvananthapuram